The 1937 Salvadoran Football Championship was the 5th season of the first division of Salvadoran football. Club Deportivo 33 was the season's champion, the club's first title.

Participating clubs

Tournament

Semifinals

Third-place match

Final

Bracket

References 

1937
1937 in association football